Albert Montañés was the defending champion, but chose not to participate.

Filip Krajinović won the tournament, defeating Adrian Ungur in the final.

Seeds

Draw

Finals

Top half

Bottom half

References
 Main Draw
 Qualifying Draw

Internazionali di Tennis del Friuli Venezia Giulia - Singles
Friuli
Internazionali di Tennis del Friuli Venezia Giulia